is a railway station on the Iida Line in the city of Iida, Nagano Prefecture, Japan, operated by Central Japan Railway Company (JR Central). It is also a freight terminal for the Japan Freight Railway Company.

Lines
Motozenkōji Station is served by the Iida Line and is 133.8 kilometers from the starting point of the line at Toyohashi Station.

Station layout
The station consists of a one ground-level side platform and one ground-level island platform connected by a level crossing.

Platforms

Adjacent stations

History
Motozenkōji Station opened on 18 March 1923. It was renamed  from 1943 to 1950, when it was reverted to its original name. With the privatization of Japanese National Railways (JNR) on 1 April 1987, the station came under the control of JR Central.

Passenger statistics
In fiscal 2016, the station was used by an average of 263 passengers daily (boarding passengers only).

Surrounding area
Motozenkoji village is the original home of the Zenkoji Temple, now in Nagano.

See also
 List of railway stations in Japan

References

External links
 Motozenkōji Station information 

Railway stations in Nagano Prefecture
Railway stations in Japan opened in 1923
Stations of Central Japan Railway Company
Iida Line
Iida, Nagano
Stations of Japan Freight Railway Company